Lysine 6-dehydrogenase (L-lysine epsilon-dehydrogenase, L-lysine 6-dehydrogenase, LysDH) is an enzyme with systematic name L-lysine:NAD+ 6-oxidoreductase (deaminating). This enzyme catalyses the following chemical reaction

 L-lysine + NAD+  (S)-2,3,4,5-tetrahydropyridine-2-carboxylate + NADH + H+ + NH3 (overall reaction)
 (1a) L-lysine + NAD+ + H2O  (S)-2-amino-6-oxohexanoate + NADH + H+ + NH3
 (1b) (S)-2-amino-6-oxohexanoate  (S)-2,3,4,5-tetrahydropyridine-2-carboxylate + H2O (spontaneous)

The enzyme is highly specific for L-lysine as substrate, although S-(2-aminoethyl)-L-cysteine can act as a substrate, but more slowly.

References

External links 
 

EC 1.4.1